Frank M. Whitman (September 30, 1838 – July 9, 1918 was an American soldier who fought for the Union army in the American Civil War. He received the Medal of Honor for his actions at Antietam and Spotsylvania.

Biography 
Whitman was born September 30, 1838 in Woodstock, Maine. He enlisted in the Union Army in early August 1862 and joined Company G of the 35th Massachusetts Infantry Regiment. He was discharged in 1864 for injuries received at Spotsylvania. Frank M. Whitman Died on 9 July, 1918 in Boston, Massachusetts.

Medal of Honor Citation 
For extraordinary heroism on 17 September 1862, in action at Antietam, Maryland. Private Whitman was among the last to leave the field at Antietam and was instrumental in saving the lives of several of his comrades at the imminent risk of his own. At Spotsylvania, Virginia, on 18 May 1864, he was foremost in line in the assault, where he lost a leg.         

Date of Issue: 21 February, 1874.

References 

1838 births
1918 deaths